Farr's law is a law formulated by Dr. William Farr when he made the observation that epidemic events rise and fall in a roughly symmetrical pattern. The time-evolution behavior could be captured by a single mathematical formula that could be approximated by a bell-shaped curve.

Background
In 1840, Farr submitted a letter to the Annual Report of the Registrar General of Births, Deaths and Marriages in England. In that letter, he applied mathematics to the records of deaths during a recent smallpox epidemic, proposing that:

"If the latent cause of epidemics cannot be discovered, the mode in which it operates may be investigated. The laws of its action may be determined by observation, as well as the circumstances in which epidemics arise, or by which they may be controlled."

He showed that during the smallpox epidemic, a plot of the number of deaths per quarter followed a roughly bell-shaped or "normal curve", and that recent epidemics of other diseases had followed a similar pattern.

References

Epidemiology
Statistical algorithms